Xaxa is a village in North-West District of Botswana. It is close to the Namibian border.

Population
The population was 280 in 2001 census.

References

North-West District (Botswana)
Villages in Botswana